Bryan Paul Gerzicich (born March 20, 1984) is an American professional soccer player who plays as a midfielder.

Career 
Two years after leaving Hapoel Haifa for Hapoel Acre, Gržičić rejoined Haifa.

Personal life
Gerzicich was born in Los Angeles to Argentine parents and raised in Argentina.

Footnotes

External links 
 Argentine Primera statistics at Fútbol XXI  
  
 

1984 births
Living people
Citizens of Argentina through descent
American emigrants to Argentina
American expatriate soccer players
Argentine expatriate sportspeople in Israel
Soccer players from Los Angeles
Arsenal de Sarandí footballers
Hapoel Haifa F.C. players
Hapoel Acre F.C. players
Hapoel Ironi Kiryat Shmona F.C. players
Hapoel Tel Aviv F.C. players
Maccabi Petah Tikva F.C. players
American expatriate sportspeople in Israel
Expatriate footballers in Israel
Liga Leumit players
Israeli Premier League players
American soccer players
Association football midfielders
American people of Argentine descent